Kim Kwang Mo (born 1978) is a South Korean rugby union player.

External links 
 Profile

1978 births
Living people
South Korean rugby union players
Rugby union props
Saitama Wild Knights players
Expatriate rugby union players in Japan
South Korean expatriate rugby union players
South Korean expatriate sportspeople in Japan
Asian Games medalists in rugby union
Rugby union players at the 2002 Asian Games
Medalists at the 2002 Asian Games
Asian Games gold medalists for South Korea